Tsountsou is the name of a pair of villages in the commune of Mamoudzou on Mayotte.

Populated places in Mayotte